Bitan, historically called Shi-Bitan, is a tourist spot in Xindian District, New Taipei, Taiwan. "Bitan" literally means "green lake", referring to where the Xindian River widens to form the lake. There is a well-known suspension bridge that is used only by pedestrians. The bridge can be seen on the crest of Xindian. There are many restaurants, carnival activities, and pedal boats in the area.

Transportation
Bitan can easily be reached via Taipei's metro system. The lake is walking distance southwest of the Xindian Station (south terminal station of the green line).

See also
 New Taipei

References

Landforms of New Taipei
Tourist attractions in New Taipei